Malla Municipality is the fourth municipal section of the Loayza Province in the  La Paz Department, Bolivia. Its seat is Malla.

Geography 
The Kimsa Cruz mountain range traverses the municipality. Some of the highest mountains of the municipality are listed below:

See also 
 Malla Jawira

References 

 Instituto Nacional de Estadistica de Bolivia

Municipalities of La Paz Department (Bolivia)